Alexander Yegorovich Timashev (April 15, 1818, Orenburg Governorate – February 1, 1893, Saint Petersburg) was Adjutant General (1859), Cavalry General (1872); in 1856–1861 – Chief of Staff of the Gendarme Corps and Manager of the Third Section of His Imperial Majesty's Own Chancellery; in 1867–1868 – Minister of Posts and Telegraphs; in 1868–1878 – Minister of Internal Affairs of the Russian Empire.

Biography
Alexander Timashev came from an old noble family. Born April 3, 1818, in the Orenburg Province, where at that time his father served and owned the estate. The son of Major General Yegor Timashev and his wife Ekaterina Alexandrovna, née Zagryazhskaya.

Educated at the Noble Boarding School at the Imperial Moscow University and at the School of Guards Ensigns and Cavalry Junkers.

On September 27, 1835, he was released from the School and enlisted as a non–commissioned officer in the Izmailovsky Life Guards Regiment, and a year later, on December 3, 1836, he was promoted to sub–ensign. On September 1, 1837, he received his first officer rank – ensign, on September 12 of the same year, he was transferred to the Life Guards Grenadier Regiment.

On April 29, 1840, he was transferred to the Cavalry Guard Regiment and renamed into cornet. On April 21, 1842, he was promoted to lieutenant.

On February 19, 1844, Timashev was sent to the Separate Caucasian Corps, where he arrived in April. On September 17–18 of the same year, he took part in his first battle with the highlanders, for which he was awarded the Order of Saint Anne of the 3rd Degree With a Bow. Having received the rank of adjutant wing on December 6, 1844, in January 1845, he returned to Saint Petersburg. On April 21, 1845, he was promoted to staff captain, and on July 1, 1848, to captain.

During these years, with the rank of adjutant wing, he was regularly sent around the empire to carry out various assignments, such as monitoring the progress of recruits, conducting investigations in case of incidents, examining troops affected by the cholera epidemic, and others. He also accompanied Emperor Nicholas I on numerous trips around Russia.

On June 18, 1849, he was sent to the detachment of Lieutenant General Grotengelm, who participated in the campaign in Transylvania against the rebellious Hungarians. Arriving at the detachment, on June 26–27, he took part in the battle near the village of Koshno, the attack on Bystritsa and in the pursuit of the Hungarians to Seredfilvo. On July 3, he participated in the battle at Galati, on July 9 – in the capture of the town of Safhegan and the pursuit of the enemy to the village of Sharonberk, and on July 24, commanding two squadrons of the Elisavetgrad Uhlan Regiment, defeated the enemy rear guard near the village of Shariot.

On August 7, 1849, Timashev was promoted to colonel, and on August 10 he was sent to Shabo, where he accepted the surrender of a 15–thousandth detachment of Hungarians. On August 12, he left Hungary and went to Warsaw, where Nicholas I was at that time.

On December 6, 1850, Colonel Timashev was appointed to the correcting position of Chief of Staff of the 3rd Reserve Cavalry Corps, with whom he took part in the campaign of 1854–1855 after the start of the Crimean War. On August 29, 1855, he was appointed correcting the post of Chief of Staff of the 3rd Army Corps, which fought in the Crimea. On September 13, he was confirmed in office.

On September 22, 1855, he was promoted to major general with an appointment to the Retinue of His Majesty, with the retention of his post. On February 16, 1856, Timashev was instructed to hold a meeting at the Stone Bridge across the Black River with representatives of the Anglo–French troops to agree on the final terms of the armistice and determine the demarcation line.

On May 11, 1856, he was dismissed from the post of Chief of Staff of the 3rd Army Corps, and on August 26 of the same year, he was appointed Chief of Staff of the Gendarme Corps and Manager of the 3rd Department of His Imperial Majesty's Own Chancellery. On September 24, 1856, he was also appointed a member of the General Directorate of Censorship, and on December 20, 1858, a member of the Committee of Railways.

On April 17, 1859, he was awarded the rank of Adjutant General. From September 10, 1859, he temporarily served the duties of the Chief of Gendarmes and the Chief of the 3rd Department. Not getting along with his immediate superior, the Chief of the Gendarmes, Prince Vasily Dolgorukov, finding him too liberal, and also not agreeing with the basic principles of peasant reform, Timashev submitted a petition to relieve him of his post. On March 18, 1861, he was dismissed on indefinite leave.

On May 29, 1863, he was appointed interim Governor–General of Kazan, Perm and Vyatka. On August 30 of the same year, he was promoted to lieutenant general. On October 19, 1864, he was dismissed from his post of Governor–General, due to its abolition.

On February 28, 1865, Timashev received permission to leave "to Russia and abroad, until the illness was cured", with the preservation of his salary. Due to poor health, he left for the south of France, where he was engaged in sculpture and photography.

After the death of Count Ivan Tolstoy, on December 12, 1867, Timashev received the post of Minister of Posts and Telegraphs, but already on March 9, 1868, the ministry was abolished, with the inclusion of its departments in the Ministry of Internal Affairs, and Timashev was appointed Minister of Internal Affairs, instead of Peter Valuev.

On June 12, 1870, he was appointed Chairman of the Committee on Provincial and Uyezd Institutions, on January 1, 1872, he was promoted to General From the Cavalry, on April 30, 1872, he was appointed a member of the Committee for the Affairs of the Kingdom of Poland, in 1876 – Chairman of the Committee on the Application of the City Regulation of 1870 in the Baltic Cities Provinces.

During Timashev's tenure as Minister of Internal Affairs, a city regulation was introduced in 1870, the transformation of peasant institutions in 1874 was made, the postal part was improved to a large extent, some General Governorships were abolished, the provinces of the Kingdom of Poland were subordinated to the Ministry of Internal Affairs, and the introduction of the Russian language in the Baltic provinces as an official and business language has begun. He was an opponent of bourgeois transformations, one of the active organizers of the struggle against the revolutionary and terrorist movement.

On November 27, 1878, he was dismissed from the post of Minister of the Interior, leaving him in the Suite and being appointed a member of the State Council, in which he was a member of the committee on prison reform.

In May 1883, he took part in the coronation ceremony of Emperor Alexander III and Empress Maria Feodorovna. On May 15, during the Imperial exit to the Assumption Cathedral, he, together with Count Login Heyden, carried the Empress's purple. On the same day, he was enlisted in the lists of Her Majesty's Cavalry Regiment with the right to wear the regimental uniform.

On February 15, 1885, he was appointed a member of the Special Committee to develop a draft regulation on the special advantages of the civil service in the distant parts of the empire.

He died on January 20, 1893, in Saint Petersburg, was buried at the Nikolskoe Cemetery of the Alexander Nevsky Lavra (according to other sources, in the Tashla Family Estate in the Orenburg Province).

According to the recollections of contemporaries, "a beautiful appearance, with a significant fortune, which multiplied after his marriage to Pashkova, skillfully dancing and possessing the talent for drawing caricatures, Timashev soon acquired great success and made a successful career".

Timashev was fond of sculpting equestrian figurines and busts. Among his works are busts of Grand Duke Mikhail Pavlovich and Emperor Alexander II, figures of Empresses Alexandra Feodorovna and Maria Feodorovna. Timashev's works were exhibited at academic exhibitions. In 1869, he was elected an honorary member of the Academy of Arts, and in 1889, he was awarded the title of academician of sculpture for the bust of Alexander II and statuettes made of terracotta and marble.

Awards and honorary titles
During his service, Adjutant General Timashev was awarded numerous awards.

Russian

Foreign

Timashev was elected and approved an honorary citizen of the cities: Kazan (August 13, 1864), Vyazma (January 3, 1869), Kharkov (May 30, 1869), Skopin (December 26, 1869), Belgorod (April 10, 1870), Orenburg (July 26, 1870) Kaluga (December 25, 1870), Petrozavodsk (June 19, 1871), Saratov (October 29, 1871), Nizhny Novgorod (August 9, 1873), Tambov (August 9, 1873), Gzhatsk (March 8, 1874), Rybinsk (April 12, 1874), Odessa (April 12, 1874), Novgorod (June 14, 1874), Kamyshin (May 22, 1875), Rostov (July 25, 1875), Yekaterinoslav (January 9, 1876), Penza (January 25, 1876), Saransk (January 25, 1876), Smolensk (1878).

On February 27, 1873, he was elected an honorary member of the Pskov Ioanno–Ilyinsky Community of Sisters of Mercy, on June 29, 1873 – an honorary member of the Society of Zealots of Orthodoxy and Charity in the Northwest Territory, and on November 25, 1878 – an honorary member of the Imperial Society of Agriculture of Southern Russia.

Family

Wife (from November 10, 1848) – Ekaterina Pashkova (October 2, 1829 – October 15, 1899), maid of honor of the court, daughter of Major General Alexander Pashkov (1792–1868) from a marriage with Elizaveta Kindyakova (1805–1854). According to Mikhail Osorgin, Madame Pashkov "was, if not a beauty in the full sense of the word, then, in any case, a very prominent, attractive person, and, as they said, was the subject of platonic adoration of her cousin Nikolai Mezentsev's entire life". She was "a sweet and gentle creature; she was engaged in children and housekeeping", wrote Alexandra Smirnova about her. For the merits of her husband, on March 28, 1871, she was awarded a knightly lady of the Order of Saint Catherine (Lesser Cross). She was buried in the church fence of the village of Tashla, Orenburg Province, in the family crypt. Born in marriage:
Nikolai (1849–1877), was single;
Alexander (1857–1904), Orenburg Provincial Leader of the Nobility, equestrian;
Maria (1857–1943), married to the Cavalry Guard Ivan Musin–Pushkin;
Elizabeth (born October 17, 1861, Paris), goddaughter of Vasily Pashkov.

Poem by Alexey Tolstoy
Alexander Timashev entered the history of literature as the hero of the satirical poem by Alexey Tolstoy "History of the Russian State from Gostomysl to Timashev", written in the year of his appointment as Minister of Internal Affairs (1868). The humorously exaggerated figure of the minister, as presented by Tolstoy, crowns the thousand–year–old Russian history and finally brings the "order" that was absent in Russia all this time, about which the narrator narrates in the "chronicle syllable":

Remembrance
On October 30, 2019, in Orenburg, opposite the building of the Office of the Ministry of Internal Affairs in the Orenburg Region, a bust of Alexander Timashev was installed.

References

Sources
Pyotr Dolgorukov. Petersburg Sketches. Emigrant Pamphlets. 1860–1867 / Pyotr Dolgorukov; Executive Editor Nikolay Chulkov – Moscow: Yurayt, 2019 – pp. 71–75 – (Anthology of Thought) – 
Ministry of the Interior. 1802–1902. Historical Sketch – Saint Petersburg, 1902 – pp. 108–109
Collection of Biographies of Cavalry Guards. 1826–1908: On the Occasion of the Centenary of the Her Majesty's Cavalry Guards Regiment, Empress Maria Feodorovna / Edited by Sergei Panchulidzev – Saint Petersburg, 1908 – Volume 4 – pp. 134–135
Timashev, Alexander Egorovich // Brockhaus and Efron Encyclopedic Dictionary: In 86 Volumes (82 Volumes and 4 Additional) – Saint Petersburg, 1890–1907
Denis Shilov. Statesmen of the Russian Empire. 1802–1917: Bibliographic Reference – Edition 2 – Saint Petersburg, 2002 – pp. 724–727

External links
Timashev Alexander Egorovich

1818 births
1893 deaths
Recipients of the Order of St. Vladimir, 1st class
Recipients of the Order of the White Eagle (Russia)
Recipients of the Order of St. Vladimir, 2nd class
Recipients of the Order of St. Anna, 1st class
Recipients of the Order of Saint Stanislaus (Russian), 1st class
Recipients of the Order of St. Vladimir, 3rd class
Recipients of the Order of St. Anna, 2nd class
Commanders Grand Cross of the Order of the Sword
Knights Grand Cross of the Order of Saints Maurice and Lazarus
Grand Crosses of the Order of the Dannebrog
Grand Croix of the Légion d'honneur
People of the Caucasian War
Members of the State Council (Russian Empire)